The 1974–75 Michigan Wolverines men's basketball team represented the University of Michigan in intercollegiate college basketball during the 1974–75 season. The team played its home games in the Crisler Arena in Ann Arbor, Michigan, and was a member of the Big Ten Conference.  Under the direction of head coach Johnny Orr, the team finished second in the Big Ten Conference.  The team earned the second of four consecutive NCAA Division I men's basketball tournament invitations.  Joe Johnson and C. J. Kupec served as team captains and shared team MVP honors. John Robinson led the Big Ten in field goal percentage with a 60.3% average in conference games, while Kupec led the conference in free throw percentage with an 88.0%.  As a team, they led the conference in free throw percentage as well with a 75.8%. The team began the season ranked seventeenth,  peaked at eleventh, and finished the season in nineteenth in the Associated Press Top Twenty Poll.  It was ranked for a total of eight of nineteen weeks during the season.  The team ended the season unranked in the final UPI Coaches' Poll.  Kupec was selected as an All-American.  The team's 74.4% free throw percentage was a school record that lasted 11 seasons.  On January 2, 1975, Kupec went 14 for 14 in free throw attempts against Illinois which continues to be a school single-game record for most without a miss, surpassing Craig Dill's total of 12. The team set a school single-season free throw percentage record of 74.4% that would last until 1986.

In the 32-team 1975 NCAA Division I men's basketball tournament, Michigan was eliminated from the West Region in the first round by the UCLA Bruins 103–91.

Roster

Rankings

Team players drafted into the NBA
Six players from this team were selected in the NBA Draft.

See also
 NCAA Men's Division I Tournament bids by school
 NCAA Men's Division I Tournament bids by school and conference
 NCAA Division I men's basketball tournament all-time team records

References

Michigan
Michigan
Michigan Wolverines men's basketball seasons
Michigan Wolve
Michigan Wolve